is a private university in Kashiwa, Chiba, Japan. The predecessor of the school was founded in 1904, and it was chartered as a junior college in 1987.

External links
 Official website 

Educational institutions established in 1904
Private universities and colleges in Japan
Universities and colleges in Chiba Prefecture
Kashiwa
1904 establishments in Japan